Pir Sohrab (also Romanized as Pīr Sohrāb; also known as Pīr Sorād and Pīr Sūrab) is a village in Pir Sohrab Rural District, in the Central District of Chabahar County, Sistan and Baluchestan Province, Iran. At the 2006 census, its population was 675, in 110 families.

References 

Populated places in Chabahar County